Soledad Estorach Esterri (6 February 1915, in Albatàrrec, Segrià, Spain – 14 March 1993, in Paris, France) was a Catalan anarcha-feminist. She created the Institut Mujeres Libres and Casal de la Dona Treballadora. She contributed to the papers Tierra y Libertad and Mujeres Libres as well as a book which was collectively written, Mujeres Libres.

References

1915 births
1993 deaths
People from Segrià
Anarcha-feminists
20th-century Spanish writers
Women writers from Catalonia
20th-century Spanish women writers